Mahua Acharya
Mahua  or Mahuaa may refer to:

Botany
 Madhuca longifolia or mahua, a tree in the family Sapotaceae
 Mahua (moss), a genus of mosses in family Hypnaceae

Culture and entertainment
 Mahua (snack), a Chinese fried dough twist
 Mahuli (wine) or mahua, a fruit wine of Odisha, Jharkhand, India, made from Madhuca longifolia flowers
 Mahuaa (film), a 2018 Indian Nagpuri film
 Mahuaa TV, an Indian Bhojpuri-language television channel

Places
 Mahua, Bihar, in Vaishali District, Bihar, India
 Mahua (Vidhan Sabha constituency), an assembly constituency in Vaishali District, Bihar, India
 Mahua Waterfall, in Crocker Range National Park, Malaysia

People
 Mahua Moitra (born 1974), Indian politician
 Mahua Mukherjee, Indian dancer and choreographer
 Mahua Roychoudhury (1958–1985), Indian actress
 Mahua Sarkar, sociologist

See also
 
 Mahuva (disambiguation)